Brian Leonard Redhead (28 December 1929 – 23 January 1994) was a British author, journalist and broadcaster. He was a co-presenter of the Today programme on BBC Radio 4 from 1975 until 1993, shortly before his death. He was a great lover and promoter of the city of Manchester and the North West in general, where he lived for most of his career.

Biography
Redhead was born in Newcastle upon Tyne. He was the only child of Ernest Leonard Redhead, a silk screen printer and advertising agent, and his wife, Janet Crossley (née Fairley). He was educated at the Royal Grammar School in Newcastle. After national service, he read history at Downing College, Cambridge.

His career in journalism started in 1954 as a journalist for the Manchester Guardian newspaper. He married Jean Salmon (known as Jenni) on 19 June 1954. They had four children: two sons, Stephen and James, and twins, Annabel (known as Abby) and William.

He became northern editor of The Guardian in 1965, and editor of the Manchester Evening News in 1969. After being passed over for the editorship of The Guardian in favour of Peter Preston in 1975, he left to join the Today programme on BBC Radio 4, replacing Robert Robinson. He was already an experienced broadcaster, having been 'discovered' around 1960 by a BBC Manchester producer, Olive Shapley, who was looking for a presenter of a television programme called Something to Read:I held auditions over two days and there were some promising people. However, on the second day a young man turned up who was clearly highly intelligent and knowledgable[sic], oozed confidence, communicated effortlessly through the camera, was very funny and never stopped talking. I knew instantly that this was the one.Later, Redhead presented Points North on television, and chaired the Saturday night Radio 4 topical conversation programme A Word in Edgeways for many years.

He formed a partnership with fellow Today presenter John Timpson which lasted for over 10 years. Redhead and Timpson had a series of running jokes on the programme, including the mythical organisations "The Friends of the M6" (long-suffering motorists trapped in its frequent traffic jams) and "The League of Pear-Shaped Men" (of which he and Timpson were the principal members). His sense of humour often appeared in asides in the Today programme. Talking of a convoy moving at 3 mph, Redhead observed that was probably 3 mph faster than they were moving on the M25 motorway that morning. When working the same slot as John Humphrys, he gleefully reported that Humphrys had turned up for work on his day off (probably before 6.00am) and was livid. On another occasion, he reported that the weather would be "brighter in the north than the south, like the people". Sue MacGregor and Peter Hobday were also co-presenters, and the team was celebrated in 1987. 

During his time on the Today programme, Redhead was accused of political bias by Conservative Chancellor Nigel Lawson, and in reply enquired "Do you think we should have a one-minute silence now in this interview, one for you to apologise for daring to suggest that you know how I vote and secondly perhaps in memory of monetarism which you have now discarded?" He later had a similar set-to with Trade and Industry Secretary Peter Lilley.

The feeling was that Redhead was to the left of his co-presenter John Timpson. Many years later Libby Purves, who also presented Today at the time, characterised them as classic opposites – Redhead the self-made Northerner, with social democratic leanings and aspirations to better himself, Timpson the gentle (and, perhaps, gently declining in terms of social prestige) old-school conservative middle class Southerner. In her words, Timpson "wanted it to be 1950", while Redhead "was more than ready for the New Britain of the 21st century, although he died before seeing its birth". However, Redhead claimed to be more of a Tory wet, not a socialist, and stated that he had cast a personal vote for Macclesfield's Conservative MP, Nicholas Winterton.

The death of Redhead's youngest son, William, in a car crash in France in 1982, aged 18, led him to rediscover religious faith, and he became a confirmed member of the Church of England a few months later. In the Radio 4 series The Good Book, he charted the history of the Bible. In the last years of his life, there was some speculation that after his retirement from Today he would train for ordination as an Anglican priest. He was also a strong supporter of the hospice movement, ambiguously calling it "the best thing that has happened in this country since the Second World War". He became Chancellor of Manchester University.

During the First Gulf War in 1991, he was a volunteer presenter on the BBC Radio 4 News FM service.

Death

In 1993, his health started to fail and he was in pain on his left side and leg. He was thought to need hip surgery, but in fact had a ruptured appendix which was leaking toxins, causing liver and kidney failure and other problems. He took leave from Today in early December, expecting to return after Christmas, but died in January 1994.

Books by Brian Redhead
(with Frances Gumley) The Good Book. Gerald Duckworth & Co Ltd, 1987 Hardcover, 1988 Paperback
(with Kenneth McLeish (ed.)), The Anti-Booklist. London: Hodder & Stoughton, 1981 
 (with Geoffrey Berry) A Love of the Lakes. Constable, 1988 
The National Parks of England Wales. Oxford Illustrated Press, 1988. Hardcover; reissued by Magna Books June 1994
Plato to NATO: Studies on political thought. Penguin Books, 23 February 1995 
Personal Perspectives. Harper Collins Publishers, January 1996. Hardcover 
Manchester – a Celebration. London: André Deutsch Limited, 1993, ; reissued by Trafalgar Square Publishing, 1994
North West of England. BBC Books. 1994

References

External links
Obituary, The Independent
Radio Hall of Fame: Brian Redhead
Manchester Celebrities: Brian Redhead

1929 births
1994 deaths
Writers from Newcastle upon Tyne
People educated at the Royal Grammar School, Newcastle upon Tyne
Alumni of Downing College, Cambridge
English male journalists
English non-fiction writers
The Guardian journalists
English radio personalities
British radio people
English television presenters
English male non-fiction writers